Fort Phoenix State Reservation is a public recreation area on Buzzards Bay in the town of Fairhaven, Massachusetts. The reservation encompasses  adjacent to the remains of Fort Phoenix, an American Revolutionary War fort and national landmark from which the reservation takes its name. Off shore, the first naval battle of the Revolutionary War was fought near the Elizabeth Islands, which may be visible from the remnants of the fort's ramparts. The state park is maintained by the Massachusetts Department of Conservation and Recreation, while Fort Phoenix is separately managed and maintained by the town of Fairhaven.

Park history
Military use of the fort ended in 1876. The reservation's beach saw the first flush of popularity in the 1880s when visitors were brought here by trolley from New Bedford.

The property was put up for sale by the United States Government, and was bought in 1925 for $5,000 by Cara Broughton, daughter of Fairhaven native and Standard Oil Company industrialist Henry Huttleston Rogers, who then presented Fort Phoenix to the Town of Fairhaven as a public park. Fort Phoenix was placed on the National Register of Historic Places in 1973.

Activities and amenities
The park's half-mile beachfront offers swimming, hiking, picnicking and wheelchair-accessible restrooms, as well as tennis and basketball courts, outdoor showers, grills, and playground.

References

External links
Fort Phoenix State Reservation Department of Conservation and Recreation

State parks of Massachusetts
Parks in Bristol County, Massachusetts
Fairhaven, Massachusetts
1925 establishments in Massachusetts
Protected areas established in 1925